The On the Political Affairs of the Karabakh khanate in 1747–1805  was a book written in Russian by Ahmad bey Javanshir about the history of the Qarabagh (Karabakh) region.

Manuscript
His daughter Hamida Javanshir took the manuscript of historical work On the Political Affairs of the Karabakh khanate in 1747–1805 to Tiflis (capital of present-day Georgia) in order to get it printed at the Geyrat publishing house.

See also
Garabaghname by Mirza Adigozal bey
Tarikh-e Qarabagh  by Jamal Javanshir Qarabaghi

Publications 
Джеваншир А. О политическомъ существованiи Карабачскаго ханства съ 1747 по 1805 годъ. — Тифлисъ: тип. Канц. главноначальствующаго гражд. частiю на Кавказѣ, 1884. — 21 с.
Джеваншир А. О политическом существовании Карабагского ханства с 1747 по 1805 год. — Шуша: типо-лит. А. М. Мугдусиакопова, 1901. — 75 с.
Джеваншир А. О политическом существовании карабахского ханства (с 1747 по 1805 год). — Баку: Изд-во АН Азерб. ССР, 1961. — 104 с. — 6500 экз.  (рус.)  (азерб.)

References

External links 
Qarabağnamələr

History of the Republic of Artsakh
Karabakh Khanate
Russian books